The Prime Ministers' club is an unofficial gathering in Lebanon that currently consists of Prime Ministers Saad Hariri, Tammam Salam, Najib Mikati and Fouad Siniora.

References 

Prime Ministers of Lebanon
Future Movement
Politics of Lebanon

Political terminology in Lebanon